Psycheotrephes is a genus of sea cucumbers in the family Psychropotidae.

Species
The following species are recognised in the genus Psycheotrephes:
 Psycheotrephes discoveryi Rogacheva & Cross in Rogacheva et al., 2009
 Psycheotrephes exigua Théel, 1882
 Psycheotrephes magna Hansen, 1975
 Psycheotrephes recta (Vaney, 1908)

References

Holothuroidea genera
Psychropotidae
Taxa named by Johan Hjalmar Théel